The 2005–06 KFC Cup was the 32nd edition of the Regional Super50, the domestic limited-overs cricket competition for the countries of the West Indies Cricket Board (WICB). The competition was the first to be sponsored by KFC, with a sponsorship contract only being signed after the opening round had already been played.

The six teams participating in the competition were Barbados, Guyana, Jamaica, the Leeward Islands, Trinidad and Tobago, and the Windward Islands. The round-robin stage was played in Barbados, with the semi-finals and final all played in Guyana, at Georgetown's Bourda. Guyana were undefeated in the round-robin, and eventually defeated Barbados in the final to win their ninth domestic one-day title. Guyanese batsman Ramnaresh Sarwan led the tournament in runs, while Barbadian fast bowler Corey Collymore took the most wickets.

Squads

Round-robin stage

Finals

Semi-finals

Final

Statistics

Most runs
The top five run scorers (total runs) are included in this table.

Source: CricketArchive

Most wickets

The top five wicket takers are listed in this table, listed by wickets taken and then by bowling average.

Source: CricketArchive

References

2005 in West Indian cricket
2005–06 West Indian cricket season
Regional Super50 seasons
Domestic cricket competitions in 2005–06